Murad Parvez  is a Bangladeshi film and television director. He was director of Chandragrohon and Brihonnola and directed many TV serials in Bangladesh.

Career
Murad Parvez is a well-known Director, Producer, Writer of Bangla film industry who began his career at an young age. He has directed many TV serials in Bangladesh.He earned much name and fame for directed Chandragrohon and Brihonnola. He has a huge fanbase both in Bangladesh and India. He won Bangladesh National Film Award for Best Actor for his role in the film Ghani: The Cycle (2006).

Works

Television 
 Smiritir Alpona Anki

Films

References

External links
 
 
 Murad Parvez on BMDb

Living people
Bangladeshi television directors
Bangladeshi film directors
Best Director National Film Award (Bangladesh) winners
1972 births
Best Film Directing Meril-Prothom Alo Critics Choice Award winners
Best Screenplay National Film Award (Bangladesh) winners
Best Dialogue National Film Award (Bangladesh) winners